The Refreshment Committee was a select committee of the House of Lords appointed to advise on the House's refreshment services, such restaurants in the Lords portions of the Palace of Westminster, within the strategic and financial framework established by the House Committee.

It was replaced by the Services Committee.

See also
List of Committees of the United Kingdom Parliament

External links
Refreshment Committee (Lords) − UK Parliament
The records of the Refreshment Committee are held by the Parliamentary Archives

Committees of the House of Lords